Cornelia Postuma or Postuma Cornelia (born between 78-77 BC) was the only daughter of Roman Dictator Sulla and his fifth wife Valeria Messalla. She was Sulla's fifth and final known child.

Life
Postuma was delivered some months after Sulla's death. It is uncertain if her name "Postuma" was a praenomen or cognomen as the usage of the name "Postuma" as a female praenomen is unattested in epigraphical evidence for the Roman Republic period but it would have been unusual to give a cognomen at such an early date. The male equivalent praenomen Postumus is well attested. Her birth was highly significant as it unified Sulla's family with that of her mother’s.

She had three surviving older half siblings; Cornelia Silla, the twins Faustus Cornelius Sulla and Fausta Cornelia as well as a brother who died young. Her oldest sister Silla already had children by the time Postuma was born.

T. F. Carney presumes that she died young since there is no further mentions of her in literature, he states that a member of such a notorious household could not have failed to be mentioned somewhere if she had been old enough to marry. He assumes both she and her half-brother died in congenital infection, perhaps contracted by her mother from Sulla who himself died of infected ulcers.

Cultural depictions
In Colleen McCullough's book Fortune's Favourites Postuma's mother Valeria expresses doubt that she is actually Sulla's child, believing that she was instead fathered by her lover Metrobius.

See also
 Posthumously born notable people
 List of Roman women
 Roman naming conventions for females

Notes

References

Bibliography 
 

1st-century BC Roman women
1st-century BC Romans
Cornelii Sullae
Children of Sulla